Dead Meat is a 2004 Irish zombie film written and directed by Conor McMahon, starring Spanish theatre actress Marian Araujo and veteran Irish actor Eoin Whelan.

Plot summary 
An outbreak of a mutant strain of mad cow disease infects the Irish countryside, turning people into ravenous, flesh-eating zombies. Caught amid this chaos are a young Spanish tourist and the local gravedigger. Together, this unlikely duo must fight for survival.

Cast 
 Marian Araujo as Helena
 David Muyllaert as Desmond
 Eoin Whelan as Cathal Cheutan
 David Ryan as Martin
 Amy Redmond as Francie
 Kathryn Toolan as Lisa

Dan Ewing, of Australian soap opera Home and Away had an extra role as a castle zombie.

Production 
Dead Meat was filmed in and around the village of Leitrim, County Leitrim, Ireland.

Release 
According to the "making of..." featurette included in the US DVD release, the film was greenlighted under a new funding scheme from the Irish Film Board called "Microbudget Films", targeted at frugal independent filmmakers.  Dead Meat was the first microbudget film to receive a release.  To cut costs, the crew used many donated sets, filmmakers' personal vehicles and recruited volunteer extras at the local pub. Dead Meat received video distribution by Revolver Entertainment in the UK and Fangoria Entertainment in the US.

Soundtrack 
David Muyllaert, who played heroic gravedigger Desmond in Dead Meat, also sang lead on the film's title song, the punk-metal-ish "Dead Meat".

The score was composed by John Gillooley.

Reception 
Dennis Harvey of Variety wrote, "A rural Irish setting and mad cow disease plot hook do surprisingly little to distinguish fast-moving but routine zombie flick".  Beyond Hollywood called it "one of the best zombie movies, regardless of budget, to come out in recent years".  Writing in The Zombie Movie Encyclopedia: Volume 2, academic Peter Dendle said, "A few unexpected twists and a lot gorgeous scenery distinguish this otherwise straightforward B-zed flick from Ireland."

References

External links 
 
 

2004 films
2004 horror films
Irish horror films
Irish zombie films
English-language Irish films
Splatter films
2000s English-language films